Winter Magic may refer to:

Winter Magic Festival, a community festival in Katoomba, New South Wales, Australia
Winter Magic (album), a Christmas album by Hayley Westenra
"Winter Magic" (song), a 2011 single by Kara